The 1974 U.S. Clay Court Championships was a combined men's and women's tennis tournament held in Indianapolis in the United States and played on outdoor clay courts. It was part of the men's Grand Prix and women's International Grand Prix. It was the 6th edition of the tournament and was held from August 5 through August 12, 1974. First-seeded Jimmy Connors won the men's singles title and accompanying $16,000 prize money while Chris Evert took the women's title.

Finals

Men's singles

 Jimmy Connors defeated  Björn Borg 5–7, 6–3, 6–4
 It was Connors' 11th title of the year and the 28th of his career.

Women's singles

 Chris Evert defeated  Gail Chanfreau 6–0, 6–0
 It was Evert's 11th title of the year and the 34th of her career.

Men's doubles

 Jimmy Connors /  Ilie Năstase defeated  Jürgen Fassbender /  Hans-Jürgen Pohmann 6–7, 6–3, 6–4

Women's doubles
 Gail Chanfreau /  Julie Heldman defeated  Chris Evert /  Jeanne Evert 6–3, 6–1

References

 
U.S. Clay Court Championships
U.S. Men's Clay Court Championships
U.S. Men's Clay Court Championships
U.S. Clay Court Championships